Collemopsidium elegans is a lichenized fungus species in the genus Collemopsidium. It is found in Europe and in North and South America.

References

External links

Xanthopyreniaceae
Lichen species
Lichens described in 1992
Taxa named by Rolf Santesson